Claudia Laura Grigorescu (later Vanţă, born 6 January 1968) is a retired Romanian foil fencer who won a team bronze medal at the 1992 Olympics. She also won six medals at the world championships between 1987 and 1998, including a team gold in 1994 and an individual silver in 1991.

References

External links 

 
 
 

1968 births
Living people
Romanian female fencers
Romanian foil fencers
Olympic fencers of Romania
Fencers at the 1992 Summer Olympics
Olympic bronze medalists for Romania
Sportspeople from Bucharest
Olympic medalists in fencing
Medalists at the 1992 Summer Olympics